Niger North Senatorial District is known As Zone c within Niger State. The headquarters (or collation centre) for Niger North Senatorial District is Kontagora. Aliyu Sabi Abdullahi of the All Progressives Congress is the current representative of Niger North in the Senate. Niger North Senatorial District conseals 8 local government areas which includes: 
Agwara Local Government Area
Borgu Local Government Area
Kontagora Local Government Area
Magama Local Government Area
Mariga Local Government Area
Mashegu Local Government Area
Rijau Local Government Area
Wushishi Local Government Area

List of senators representing Niger North

References 

Politics of Niger State
Senatorial districts in Nigeria